Black Cats (in Persian بلک کتس) is a Los Angeles based Persian pop group founded and produced by Shahbal Shabpareh. The band was originally formed in Tehran, Iran in the 1960s and other than Shabpareh, the members have been constantly changing every few years. Some of the most popular members have been Ebi, Hassan Shamaizadeh, Farhad Mehrad, Shabpareh's brother Shahram Shabpareh and Kamran & Hooman.

Background 
The group was originally formed in 1966 in Tehran, Iran as a rock band with members Hassan Shamaizadeh, Shahram Shabpareh, Farhad Mehrad, Shahbal Shabpareh. In the 1990s, the band was relaunched in Los Angeles as a pop group. While the band members and singers changed frequently over the next three decades, Shahbal Shabpareh has consistently remained the group's main musician, producer and manager. Shahbal's brother and ex-member, Shahram Shabpareh, who originally played guitar for the band, became a very popular Persian singer after leaving the band in the 1970s.

Ebi, one of the most popular Persian singers, was part of the group Black Cats from 1967 to 1979 before starting his solo career.

Hassan Shamaizadeh, who played the saxophone for the band, also ended up being a very popular solo singer as well a song writer for many popular artists such as Googoosh.

From 1992 to 1999, Pyruz and David were the members, who were very popular. From 1999 to 2004, Kamran and Hooman were also very successful members, who ended up separating and starting their own very popular group called "Kamran & Hooman."

Kamyar & Hakim were the main members from 2004 to 2008. Kamyar Ahmadzadeh, who was influenced by Stevie Wonder, also became successful on his own. This iteration of the band was known as Black Cats Next Level.

In 2008, Shabpareh recruited two new members  Sami and Eddie and recorded an album called "Dimbology".

In 2013, the new iteration of the band was named Black Cats Ultimate, with the lead vocalist Edvin. Edvin was an X-Factor contestant based in Dubai who got the gig by contacting Shabpareh via email and then auditioning. He has since moved to Los Angeles.

Over the years they have had at least 43 members.

Style 
The band's music is traditional upbeat style of Persian pop, but are also known to blend in Jazz, R&B, Hip-Hop, Reggae, Rave and Rapcore influences into their music. Most their beats and timing is in traditional Persian shesh-o-hast format, meaning 6/8th, but often songs switch back and forth from 6/8 to 4/4 rock or pop format. Shabpareh calls it "rock dambuli."

Discography

External links 
 Black Cats on Spotify
 Long video recording of early Black Cats, featuring Farhad Mehrad and Shahbal Shabpareh

References 

Iranian musical groups
Iranian pop music groups
Musical groups from Tehran
Caltex Records artists